Science Fiction World (Sci-Fi World; SFW) (Kehuan Shijie), began in 1979, is a monthly science fiction magazine published in the People's Republic of China, headquartered in Chengdu, Sichuan. It dominates the Chinese science fiction magazine market, at one time claiming a circulation of 300,000 copies per issue, with an estimate of 3-5 readers per copy (giving it a total readership of at least 1 million) therefore making it the world's most popular science fiction periodical.

History and profile
The magazine was established in 1979 with the name Science Literature. In August 2007, the editor of Science Fiction World, Yang Xiao, organized the Chengdu International Science Fiction and Fantasy Festival, the largest such event ever held in China. An estimated 4,000 Chinese fans attended the four-day festival.

New editor and staff rebellion 
In March 2010, the staff of the magazine issued an open letter attacking new editor Li Chang for actions including: cancelling contracts with Chinese science fiction readers and authors; refusing to buy stories from authors, forcing the editors to write the stories themselves; ordering that foreign language editors do all translations into Chinese themselves instead of buying translations, and art editors create the illustrations themselves instead of hiring artists.  He also interfered with advertising, replacing the magazine's front cover with an advertisement for a school. All of these malfeasances were claimed as causes for the recent severe drop in SFW circulation, to a low of approximately 130,000. Investigations by China Youth Daily and others verified the accusations,<ref>[http://www.danwei.org/magazines/science_fiction_world_coup.php Martinsen, Joel. "MAGAZINES: Science Fiction World Topples Its Editor; Danwei.net 1 April 2010]</ref> and by 4 April Xinhua'' reported Li Chang's ouster. Later the problem was solved, and Yao Haijun became the deputy director of Science Fiction World.

See also
 Science fiction magazine
 Fantasy fiction magazine
 Horror fiction magazine
 Science fiction in China
 Flying Fantasy World, youth edition of the magazine

References

External links
The Official Website of Science Fiction World
New SF Mags Launched

1979 establishments in China
Magazines published in China
Monthly magazines published in China
Magazines established in 1979
Science fiction magazines established in the 1970s
Mass media in Chengdu
Science fiction magazines